is a type of Japanese green tea produced in Chiran, a former town in Kagoshima Prefecture, which is now part of Minamikyūshū.

Characteristics
The mild climate and fertile soil near the volcano Sakurajima are suited to growing tea.

History
Villagers started growing teas in fields in 1872. In 1934, a tea factory was built. In 1938, the tea made there was presented to the Emperor.

Green tea
Japanese tea